The 1975 Women's College World Series (WCWS) was contested among 18 college softball teams on May 15–18 in Omaha, Nebraska. This was the seventh WCWS. Connie Claussen, the tournament director for the first eleven editions of the WCWS, was also the coach of the victorious Nebraska–Omaha team.

Teams
The double elimination tournament included these teams:

 Arizona
 Ball State (Indiana)
 East Stroudsburg State College (Pennsylvania)
 Kansas
 Mankato State (Minnesota)
 Michigan State
 Nebraska–Omaha
 North Dakota State
 Northern Colorado
 Northern Iowa
 Northern State College (South Dakota)
 Northwest Missouri State
 Ohio
 Oklahoma
 Oregon College of Education (now Western Oregon University)
 Texas Woman's
 Weber State College (Utah)
 Western Illinois

After losing the opener of the final, the University of Nebraska–Omaha Maverettes defeated Northern Iowa, 6–4, in the deciding game to win the 1975 championship.

Bracket

Source:

Ranking

See also

References

Women's College World Series
Soft
Women's College World Series
Women's College World Series
Women's College World Series
Women's sports in Nebraska